Cyanothamnus yarrowmerensis is a species of erect, woody shrub that is endemic to Queensland. It has pinnate or bipinnate leaves and groups of up to seven flowers with white petals in leaf axils.

Description
The stamens and the style are hairy and the stigma is minute, scarcely wider than the style.

Taxonomy and naming
This species was first formally described in 2003 by Marco F. Duretto and given the name Boronia yarrowmerensis in the journal Muelleria from a specimen collected north of Yarrowmere Station homestead. In a 2013 paper in the journal Taxon, Marco Duretto and others changed the name to Cyanothamnus yarrowmerensis on the basis of cladistic analysis. The specific epithet (yarrowmerensis) refers to type location.

Distribution and habitat
Cyanothamnus yarrowmerensis is only known from the type location in North Queensland where it grows in Eucalyptus forest or woodland on sandy soil .

Conservation
Cyanothamnus yarrowmerensis (as Boronia yarrowmerensisis) is listed as of "least concern" by the Queensland Government Department of Environment and Science.

References 

yarrowmerensis
Flora of Queensland
Plants described in 2003
Taxa named by Marco Duretto